The 1999 Aragonese regional election was held on Sunday, 13 June 1999, to elect the 5th Cortes of the autonomous community of Aragon. All 67 seats in the Cortes were up for election. The election was held simultaneously with regional elections in 12 other autonomous communities and local elections all throughout Spain, as well as the 1999 European Parliament election.

The election saw increases in both vote share and seats for the People's Party (PP), which had formed the Government of Aragon since 1995, and the Spanish Socialist Workers' Party (PSOE). The Aragonese Party (PAR) continued its long-term decline from its peak at the 1987 election while on the left, Chunta Aragonesista (CHA) gained most of United Left (IU) former support, which lost 4 of its 5 seats.

Despite winning the election and gaining one seat from 1995, the PP went into opposition as incumbent President of Aragon Santiago Lanzuela was unable to gather the support from his former coalition partner the PAR. Instead, the PAR supported Socialist Marcelino Iglesias as new regional President, entering into a coalition administration with the PSOE.

Overview

Electoral system
The Cortes of Aragon were the devolved, unicameral legislature of the autonomous community of Aragon, having legislative power in regional matters as defined by the Spanish Constitution and the Aragonese Statute of Autonomy, as well as the ability to vote confidence in or withdraw it from a regional president.

Voting for the Cortes was on the basis of universal suffrage, which comprised all nationals over 18 years of age, registered in Aragon and in full enjoyment of their political rights. The 67 members of the Cortes of Aragon were elected using the D'Hondt method and a closed list proportional representation, with an electoral threshold of three percent of valid votes—which included blank ballots—being applied in each constituency. Seats were allocated to constituencies, corresponding to the provinces of Huesca, Teruel and Zaragoza, with each being allocated an initial minimum of 13 seats and the remaining 28 being distributed in proportion to their populations (provided that the seat-to-population ratio in the most populated province did not exceed 2.75 times that of the least populated one).

The use of the D'Hondt method might result in a higher effective threshold, depending on the district magnitude.

Election date
The term of the Cortes of Aragon expired four years after the date of their previous election. Elections to the Cortes were fixed for the fourth Sunday of May every four years. Legal amendments introduced in 1998 allowed for these to be held together with European Parliament elections, provided that they were scheduled for within a four month-timespan. The previous election was held on 28 May 1995, setting the election date for the Cortes concurrently with a European Parliament election on Sunday, 13 June 1999.

After legal amendments in 1996, the president was granted the prerogative to dissolve the Cortes of Aragon and call a snap election, provided that no motion of no confidence was in process, no nationwide election was due and some time requirements were met: namely, that dissolution did not occur either during the first legislative session or within the legislature's last year ahead of its scheduled expiry, nor before one year had elapsed since a previous dissolution under this procedure. In the event of an investiture process failing to elect a regional president within a two-month period from the first ballot, the Cortes were to be automatically dissolved and a fresh election called. Any snap election held as a result of these circumstances would not alter the period to the next ordinary election, with elected deputies merely serving out what remained of their four-year terms.

Parties and candidates
The electoral law allowed for parties and federations registered in the interior ministry, coalitions and groupings of electors to present lists of candidates. Parties and federations intending to form a coalition ahead of an election were required to inform the relevant Electoral Commission within ten days of the election call, whereas groupings of electors needed to secure the signature of at least one percent of the electorate in the constituencies for which they sought election, disallowing electors from signing for more than one list of candidates.

Below is a list of the main parties and electoral alliances which contested the election:

Opinion polls
The table below lists voting intention estimates in reverse chronological order, showing the most recent first and using the dates when the survey fieldwork was done, as opposed to the date of publication. Where the fieldwork dates are unknown, the date of publication is given instead. The highest percentage figure in each polling survey is displayed with its background shaded in the leading party's colour. If a tie ensues, this is applied to the figures with the highest percentages. The "Lead" column on the right shows the percentage-point difference between the parties with the highest percentages in a poll. When available, seat projections determined by the polling organisations are displayed below (or in place of) the percentages in a smaller font; 34 seats were required for an absolute majority in the Cortes of Aragon.

Results

Overall

Distribution by constituency

Aftermath

Notes

References
Opinion poll sources

Other

1999 in Aragon
Aragon
Regional elections in Aragon
June 1999 events in Europe